Admiral Walker (1898–2001) was an American Negro league pitcher. Admiral Walker may also refer to:

Alasdair Walker (1956–2019), British Royal Navy surgeon vice admiral
Arthur Horace Walker (1881–1947), British Royal Navy rear admiral
Asa Walker (1845–1916), U.S. Navy rear admiral
Baldwin Wake Walker (1802–1876), British Royal Navy admiral
Frank R. Walker (1899–1976), U.S. Navy rear admiral
Harold Walker (Royal Navy officer) (1891–1975), British Royal Navy admiral
James Walker (Royal Navy officer) (1764–1831), British Royal Navy rear admiral
John Grimes Walker (1835–1907), U.S. Navy rear admiral
Robyn Walker (born 1959), Royal Australian Navy rear admiral
Thomas Walker (naval officer) (1916–2003), U.S. Navy vice admiral

See also
Algernon Walker-Heneage-Vivian (1871–1952), British Royal Navy admiral
Frederic Wake-Walker (1888–1945), British Royal Navy admiral
General Walker (disambiguation)